Main Street Commercial Historic District is a historic district in Reedsburg, Wisconsin that was listed on the National Register of Historic Places in 1984. It was listed alongside the Park Street Historic District. The district consists of 21 commercial buildings. Eighteen of the buildings are brick and three are of stone construction.

History

Early history 
Main Street began as "Shanty Row", consisting of five tamarack shanties built in 1850. Over the next 10 years, the shanties were either destroyed or removed, and Main Street took their place. The Chicago & North Western Railway (C&NW) arrived in 1872, bringing with it many businesses and industries. One of the most important was the Reedsburg Woolen Mill, which was built in 1882 along the Baraboo River.

See also 

 Beastro & Barley (City Hotel) 
 National Register of Historic Places listings in Sauk County, Wisconsin

References

Historic districts on the National Register of Historic Places in Wisconsin
Commercial buildings on the National Register of Historic Places in Wisconsin
Geography of Sauk County, Wisconsin
National Register of Historic Places in Sauk County, Wisconsin
Reedsburg, Wisconsin